Marly-Gomont is a commune in the Aisne department, administrative region of Hauts-de-France (formerly Picardy), northern France.

Population

Personalities
A song by the rapper Kamini depicts Marly-Gomont.video The video received almost 16 million hits since it was posted on the YouTube website in September 2006.  Since then, a film based on the true story of Kamini's father immigrating to the town was produced in 2016 called Bienvenue à Marly-Gomont ("Welcome to Marly-Gomont"), in French, or The African Doctor, for anglophone audiences.

See also
Communes of the Aisne department

References

Communes of Aisne
Aisne communes articles needing translation from French Wikipedia